is a passenger railway station in located in the city of Matsubara,  Osaka Prefecture, Japan, operated by the private railway operator Kintetsu Railway.

Lines
Takawashi Station is served by the Minami Osaka Line, and is located 7.3 rail kilometers from the starting point of the line at Ōsaka Abenobashi Station.

Station layout
The station consists of two ground-level side platforms connected by an underground passage. Platforms 2 and 3 do not exist, and the tracks are used for through traffic.

Platforms

Adjacent stations

History
It was renamed to its present name on April 1, 1933.

Passenger statistics
In fiscal 2018, the station was used by an average of 16,958 passengers daily.

Surrounding area
Hannan University
Matsubara City Matsubara Daini Junior High School
Matsubara City Amami Elementary School
Matsubara City Amamiminami Elementary School

See also
List of railway stations in Japan

References

External links

 Kintetsu: Kawachi-Amami Station 

Railway stations in Japan opened in 1923
Railway stations in Osaka Prefecture
Matsubara, Osaka